Patients are exposed to ionizing radiation when they undergo diagnostic examinations using x-rays or radiopharmaceuticals. Radiation emitted by radioisotopes or radiation generators is utilized in therapy for cancer or benign lesions and also in interventional procedures using fluoroscopy. There has been a tremendous increase in the use of ionizing radiation in medicine during recent decades and health professionals and patients are concerned about the harmful effects of radiation. The International Atomic Energy Agency (IAEA) has established a program on radiological protection of patients in recognition of the increasing importance of this topic. The emphasis in the past had been on radiation protection of staff and this has helped to reduce radiation doses to staff at levels well below the limits prescribed by the International Commission on Radiological Protection (ICRP) and accepted by most countries. The recent emphasis on radiation protection of patients is helping in developing strategies to reduce radiation doses to patients without compromising on diagnostic or therapeutic purpose.

ALARA
"ALARA" ("As Low As Reasonably Achievable") should be maintained to reduce radiation doses to staff as well as patients.

See also
 Journal of Radiological Protection
 International Radiation Protection Association
 European Committee on Radiation Risk

References

External links 
 Radiation Protection of Patients site of the IAEA
 International Atomic Energy Agency official site

International medical and health organizations
International Atomic Energy Agency
Radiography
Radiation health effects

Radiation protection